Colonel Wilfrid William Ashley, 1st Baron Mount Temple, PC (13 September 1867 – 3 July 1939) was a British soldier and Conservative politician. He served as Minister of Transport between 1924 and 1929 under Stanley Baldwin.

Background and education
Ashley was the son of Hon. Evelyn Ashley, second surviving son of the social reformer Anthony Ashley-Cooper, 7th Earl of Shaftesbury. His mother was Sybella Charlotte Farquhar, daughter of Sir Walter Farquhar, 3rd Baronet. William Cowper-Temple, 1st Baron Mount Temple, was his great-uncle. He was educated at Harrow and Magdalen College, Oxford. He left Oxford without taking a degree, and then travelled widely, including in Africa and the Americas.

Military career
Ashley served in the Ayrshire militia (1886–9), then held an active commission in the regular army with the Grenadier Guards (1889–98), before returning to the militia when he was commissioned with the 3rd battalion of the Hampshire Regiment (1899–1902). Though in the militia, he volunteered for active service in South Africa during the Second Boer War (1899–1902), but was invalided home. He resigned from the militia with the honorary rank of major in December 1902.

Political career
Ashley's father was a Liberal Unionist and Ashley initially acted as private secretary to Sir Henry Campbell-Bannermann, beginning in 1899, when he was the leader of the opposition. After being invalided home from the South Africa in 1901, he congratulated Campbell-Bannermann on his "methods of barbarism" speech in June 1901.

Ashley, who held the rank of colonel in the British Army, was well known as an activist in various pressure groups before commencing his party political career. He was a leading figure in the Navy League and also set up the anti-state intervention No More Waste Committee during the First World War. He was subsequently involved in the foundation of the Comrades of the Great War in 1917 and as President of the group helped to ensure that the ex-servicemen's movement was closely linked to the Conservative Party at its foundation.

Ashley was elected to Parliament in 1906 to represent Blackpool, holding the seat until 1918 before subsequently sitting as member for Fylde until 1922 and New Forest from 1922 to 1932. Ashley commanded the 20th battalion of the King's Regiment (Liverpool) in 1914 in the rank of lieutenant-colonel before returning to England in 1915 to become parliamentary private secretary to the financial secretary to the War Office. Ashley, who owned Classiebawn Castle in southern Ireland, was a fierce opponent of Irish republicanism and wrote to David Lloyd George, then Prime Minister, in 1921 to ask for the protection of his Irish estates.

He served under Bonar Law and Stanley Baldwin as Parliamentary Secretary to the Ministry of Transport and Parliamentary Secretary to the Office of Works from October 1922 until October 1923, when he was appointed Under-Secretary of State for War, which he remained until January 1924. Ashley was sworn of the Privy Council in February 1924 and when the Conservatives returned to power under Baldwin in November of that year he was made Minister for Transport, an office he retained until the fall of the Baldwin administration in 1929. He left the House of Commons in 1932 and was raised to the peerage as Baron Mount Temple, of Lee in the County of Southampton, a revival of the title held by his great-uncle.

Lord Mount Temple remained active within the House of Lords and was a vocal supporter of the policy of appeasement towards Nazi Germany. He admired Adolf Hitler for his anti-communism, although much of his conviction rested on the belief that the Treaty of Versailles had been unjust to begin with and that it should be revised regardless of who was in government in Germany. In 1935, in order to underline his support for the Germans, Lord Mount Temple was instrumental in establishing the Anglo-German Fellowship. He served as chairman of both this group and Anti-Socialist Union simultaneously in the later 1930s. In October 1938, after the Munich Agreement, he was among twenty-six signatories of a letter to The Times, calling the agreement "the rectification of one of the most flagrant injustices in the peace treaties".

As AGF chairman, Lord Mount Temple (as he now was) visited Germany in mid-1937 and held a meeting with Hitler. Unlike some of his contemporaries in the Fellowship, the laissez-faire capitalist Mount Temple did not support ideological Nazism (perhaps due in part to the fact that his first wife was Jewish). In the aftermath of Kristallnacht he resigned in protest from the chairmanship although his membership of the group continued.

Personal life

In 2008, the British historian Edward Feuchtwanger described Ashley as "a strikingly good-looking man, of military bearing, courteous and tactful, with strongly held, rather conventional views, sometimes regarded as reactionary".

Lord Mount Temple married Amalia Mary Maud Cassel, daughter and only child of financier Sir Ernest Cassel, in early January, 1901. Amongst the wedding guests was The Prince Albert Edward, Prince of Wales (the wedding taking place on 4 January, only eighteen days before Albert Edward became King-Emperor), who was a friend of Cassel. The couple had two daughters:
Edwina, Countess Mountbatten of Burma (1901–1960), who married The 1st Earl Mountbatten of Burma (1900–1979)
Ruth Mary Cholmondeley, Lady Delamere (1906–1986), who married Alec Cunningham-Reid (1895–1977) in 1927. They divorced in 1940. She then married Major Ernest Laurie Gardner. They divorced in 1943. In 1944 she married the 4th Baron Delamere (1900–1979). They divorced in 1955.
Following his first wife's early death in 1911, he married in 1914 Muriel Emily ("Molly") Forbes-Sempill, the former wife of Rear-Admiral The Hon. Arthur Forbes-Sempill, daughter of The Rev. Walter Spencer of Fownhope Court, Herefordshire, and sister of Margery, Viscountess Greenwood.

 The couple commissioned the architect Oliver Hill to design two Westminster town houses, naming them both Gayfere House. The first house, built at 12 Gayfere Street (1923–26), had a drawing room completely decorated with gold leaf. The second, at the corner of Gayfere Street and Great Peter Street (1929–32), was decorated in Art Deco style, making much use of mirrored walls and ceilings, most famously in a bathroom called by the Press "Lady Mount Temple's Crystal Palace". She died on 30 June 1954 at Culver House, Penshurst, Kent aged 73.

The family also owned Classiebawn Castle on the west coast of Ireland.

Lord Mount Temple collapsed and died following a recent diagnosis of Parkinson's disease at his home Broadlands in July 1939, aged 71, at which time the barony became extinct and the Broadlands estate passed to his eldest daughter Edwina Ashley. the wife of Lord Louis Mountbatten.

References

External links 
 

1867 births
1939 deaths
Ashley, Wilfrid
Ashley, Wilfrid
Ashley, Wilfrid
Ashley, Wilfrid
Ashley, Wilfrid
Ashley, Wilfrid
Ashley, Wilfrid
Ashley, Wilfrid
Ashley, Wilfrid
UK MPs who were granted peerages
Members of the Privy Council of the United Kingdom
Barons in the Peerage of the United Kingdom
Conservative Party (UK) MPs for English constituencies
Wilfrid
People educated at Harrow School
Alumni of Magdalen College, Oxford
British Militia officers
Deputy Lieutenants of Hampshire
Secretaries of State for Transport (UK)
Grenadier Guards officers
King's Regiment (Liverpool) officers
British Army personnel of World War I
Barons created by George V